Solanum ashbyae is a species of plant in the family Solanaceae that is endemic to Western Australia. The specific epithet ashbyae honours botanical illustrator and plant collector Alison Ashby.

Description
Its growth form is that of an erect shrub, 0.5–2.5 m in height. It produces blue to purple flowers from April to August.

Distribution and habitat
It occurs on red sand or clay soils on rock outcrops and stony rises in the Gascoyne, Murchison, Pilbara and Yalgoo IBRA bioregions.

References

ashbyae
Eudicots of Western Australia
Solanales of Australia
Plants described in 1981